Lyda D. Newman ( – ?) was a hairdresser and inventor who was also an activist for women's suffrage. An African-American who patented a novel hairbrush design, she designed a durable hairbrush with synthetic bristles.

Early life 
Newman was born approximately in 1889 in Ohio, but there is no information regarding her exact dates of birth or death.  She spent the majority of her life living and working in Manhattan, New York City, specifically in the neighborhood San Juan Hill.  Records indicate that she may have been of mixed ancestry as she was cited interchangeably recording her race as "mulatto" and black on various papers. Throughout her life, Newman's primary occupation was hair care as she listed “hair specialist” or “hairdresser” in various New York City Directories and US Government Federal and New York City censuses.

In addition to her work in New York City, Newman appears to have worked with hair in Newport, Rhode Island, during the Summer season. The Newport Daily News contains the following advertisement in its July 20, 1903, edition:

“Lyda NEWMAN, OF NEW YORK. HAIR and SCALP SPECIALIST, Begs to announce that she has arrived for her ninth season in Newport and will be glad to receive calls from those desiring treatment. My original method of magnetic manipulation positively cures nervous exhaustion. Shampooing a specialty. 56 BATH ROAD.”

Patent and invention 
In the late 1800s, Newman invented a hairbrush that used synthetic bristles instead of the animal hairs commonly used for brushes at the time, making it more durable. It could also be taken apart easily for cleaning because it contained a compartment at the bottom that could be removed from the back and be cleaned. The  was filed on July 11, 1898 and granted on November 15, 1898. The hairbrush she invented is described in her patent as "simple and durable in construction" and being "very effective when in use". See gallery for diagram of the hairbrush. 

Newman was familiar with the United States Patent Office prior to filing for a patent for her brush. In the July 17, 1894, issue of the Official Gazette of the United States Patent Office, page 126, the issuance of Trademark number 25,022 is noted for the name "VIDACABELLO, 'A PREPARATION FOR THE HAIR AND SCALP.' LYDA D. NEWMAN, New York, N.Y. Filed June 19, 1894. The 'Essential feature' of the Trademark is the word 'VIDACABELLO.' Used since August 1892."

Activism 
As well as creating her patented invention, Newman was an active community member and organizer for women's suffrage in the early 20th century. As a suffragist, she spent her time canvassing neighborhoods in New York City, hosted street meetings to educate passing people,  and to support the Woman Suffrage Party, Newman started the Negro Suffrage Headquarters in Manhattan.  

On August 29, 1915, the New York Times noted under "Suffrage Centre for Negroes", "The Woman Suffrage Party is to open a suffrage headquarters for colored people at 207 West Sixty-third Street on Wednesday. This will be in charge of Miss Lyda Newman, who is doing excellent work for suffrage among her own people. The headquarters will be gayly decorated with suffrage posters, flags and streamers. Many colored women have been asked to play hostess at the new headquarters while Miss Newman goes canvassing among voters in the neighborhood (sic)." 

On Thursday, September 2, 1915, the New York Times followed up with a second news blurb under "Negro Suffrage Headquarters", "Headquarters for the work of the negro suffragists were opened at 207 West Sixty-third Street last evening with a big open-air meeting outside the building. Miss Lyda D. Newman is in charge of the work,  and will continue canvasing and organizing street meetings through the thirteenth Assembly District from now until election day. Dr. Mary Halton and Miss Portia Willis were among the speakers last evening. Sixty-third Street was opened yesterday as a play street with no traffic from 3 to 9 P.M., and mothers are invited to the headquarters and watch their children play from the windows (sic)."

In 1924, seven years after women's suffrage was achieved in the year 1917, Lyda Newman can be found on the 51st election district for New York City voter list as a registered voter. 

Lyda D Newman was a female inventor who rose to fame following her invention of the first hairbrush with synthetic bristles. She was born sometime between 1865 and 1885 in Ohio. Little is known about her personal life, due to the way women—especially Black women—were treated during the time. However, records show that she spent the majority of her life living and working in Manhattan, specifically in San Juan Hill. New York censuses state that her main occupation throughout the majority of her life was as a hairdresser. When working as a hairdresser, Newman noticed how hard it was to effectively style textured hair with brushes made from animal hair. Because of this, she created a hairbrush with synthetic bristles, which were more durable and easier to clean. The design of her new hairbrush contained evenly spaced rows of bristles with open slots to clear debris away from the hair and into a recessed compartment, which made it effective for cleaning the device. The brush also had a button that when clicked, the bristle part would detach and a new one could be put in. This meant that hairdressers could now have a new brush, instead of having to clean the brush between clients. She filed for a patent for her design on July 11, 1898 and received U.S. Patent 614,335 on November 15, 1898. With this patent, Newman became the third Black woman to ever receive one. Modern hairbrushes still use Newman’s design, with the only changes being aesthetic. Lyda’s invention changed the hair-care industry, due to the fact that her design made hairbrushes less expensive, easier to manufacture, and effective to use on textured hair. 

Lyda Newman was also an active member and organizer for the women’s suffragette movement in the early 20th century. She worked as one of the organizers of an African American branch of the Negro Suffrage Party, which advocated to give women the legal right to vote. Newman focused on campaigning in her neighborhood in New York by canvassing in order to raise awareness and gather people to attend suffrage meetings within her voting district, and she even arranged to close down the street so that mothers could attend meetings at the suffrage center with their children and see them playing outside from the windows. She worked closely with other prominent white suffragists of the party, and was an instrumental part in the movement. She was also in charge of the Negro Suffrage Headquarters in Manhattan, a division of the Women Suffrage Party specifically for colored people. She was given this position due to her excellent work for suffrage among her own people. In 1924, seven years after women were given the right to vote, Lyda Newman was found on the 51st election drastic for New York City voter list as a registered voter. Newman’s marriage status was listed as single from 1905-1925, so it appears she never married, which was uncommon for a woman in the early 1900’s. Lyda Newman’s exact date of death is unknown, but her memory still lives on through her invention, which is still a staple item today.

References

African-American inventors
19th-century American inventors
Women inventors
People from Manhattan
Engineers from New York City
American women engineers
American suffragists
African-American suffragists
Activists from New York City